5222 Ioffe, provisional designation , is a rare-type carbonaceous Palladian asteroid from the central region of the asteroid belt, approximately 18 kilometers in diameter. It was discovered on 11 October 1980, by Soviet astronomer Nikolai Chernykh at the Crimean Astrophysical Observatory in Nauchnyj, Crimea. It is the largest of the Palladian asteroids apart from Pallas itself.

Classification and orbit 

Ioffe is a member of the Pallas family, a small, carbonaceous asteroid family in the central main-belt.

It orbits the Sun at a distance of 2.4–3.2 AU once every 4 years and 7 months (1,689 days). Its orbit has an eccentricity of 0.14 and an inclination of 35° with respect to the ecliptic. A first precovery was taken at Palomar Observatory in 1952, extending the asteroid's observation arc by 28 years prior to its official discovery observation at Nauchnyj.

Physical characteristics 

In the SMASS classification Ioffe is a carbonaceous B-type asteroid, in line with the overall spectral type of the Palladian asteroids.

Photometric observations of this asteroid collected during 2006 show a rotation period of 19.4 ± 0.2 hours with a brightness variation of 0.27 ± 0.03 magnitude.

Naming 

This minor planet was named in memory of Soviet physicist Abram Ioffe (1880–1960), an expert in electromagnetism, radiology, crystals, high-impact physics, thermoelectricity and photoelectricity. Ioffe was a pioneer in the investigation of semiconductors. Proposed by the Institute of Theoretical Astronomy, naming citation was published on 5 March 1996.

References

External links 
 Lightcurve plot of 5222 Ioffe, Palmer Divide Observatory, B. D. Warner (2004)
 Asteroid Lightcurve Database (LCDB), query form (info )
 Dictionary of Minor Planet Names, Google books
 Asteroids and comets rotation curves, CdR – Observatoire de Genève, Raoul Behrend
 Discovery Circumstances: Numbered Minor Planets (1)-(5000) – Minor Planet Center
 
 

005222
Discoveries by Nikolai Chernykh
Named minor planets
005222
19801011